The Veroli Casket is a Middle Byzantine casket, probably made in Constantinople (now Istanbul) in the late 10th or early 11th century, and now in Room 8 of the Victoria and Albert Museum, London. It is thought to have been made for a person close to the Imperial Court of Constantinople, the capital of the Byzantine Empire, and may have been used to hold scent bottles or jewellery. It was later in the Cathedral Treasury at Veroli, south east of Rome, until 1861.

Its dimensions are: height: 11.5 cm, length: 40.3 cm, width: 15.5-16 cm, and weight: 1.72 kg.

The casket is made of carved ivory and bone panels showing scenes from classical mythology. On the lid is a depiction of the Rape of Europa. On the front are scenes from the stories of Bellerophon and Iphigenia. On the back is part of a dionysiac procession, with two figures identified as Mars, god of war (the Greek Ares), and Venus, goddess of love (the Greek Aphrodite). The ends bear scenes of Bacchus, god of wine (the Greek Dionysius), in a chariot drawn by panthers, and a nymph riding a seahorse.  There is a carcass of wood, metal fittings, and the lid is hinged.

As the Empire had been Christianised for centuries, these pagan motifs presumably represent a revived taste for classical style and imagery.  The size and quality of the casket suggest it was made for someone in the inner court circle.

The casket from Veroli is one of some 43 caskets, in addition to dozens more separated panels, that show a fashion for "pseudo-antique motives derived from silver plate or manuscripts, put together with little understanding of the original significance," as Sir Kenneth Clark observed of the group as a whole, during the medieval eclipse of the nude.  It is also one of the Byzantine type known as "rosette caskets" from the use of rows of carved rosettes in the sections outside the scenes with figures; the quality of the carving makes this "the finest" of the group.

Notes

References

"V&A": V&A page (with many more images)

Further reading

Evans, Helen C. & Wixom, William D., The glory of Byzantium: art and culture of the Middle Byzantine era, A.D. 843-1261, no. 153, 1997, The Metropolitan Museum of Art, New York, ; full text available online from The Metropolitan Museum of Art Libraries

10th-century sculptures
11th-century sculptures
Collections of the Victoria and Albert Museum
Containers
Byzantine ivory
Dionysus in art
Bone carvings
Ivory works of art